Malin Millbourn (born 29 December 1971) is a Swedish Olympic sailor competing in match racing. She won the 2003 ISAF Women's Match Racing World Championship.

References

Swedish female sailors (sport)
1971 births
Living people
Europe class sailors
Europe class world champions
World champions in sailing for Sweden
Olympic sailors of Sweden 
Sailors at the 1996 Summer Olympics – Europe
Place of birth missing (living people)